is the seventh single by B'z, released on October 24, 1990. This song is one of B'z many number-one singles in Oricon chart. The single was re-released in 2003, and re-entered at #12. It sold over 354,000 copies according to Oricon.

An edited version of the song plays over the opening credits of their video compilation Film Risky, while the B-side, a re-recorded version of "Guitar Kids Rhapsody" from their second album, Off the Lock, is one of the featured videos.

Track listing

Guitar Kids Rhapsody Camden Lock Style

Certifications

References

External links
B'z official website

1990 singles
B'z songs
Oricon Weekly number-one singles
Songs written by Tak Matsumoto
Songs written by Koshi Inaba
1990 songs
BMG Japan singles